The Clairvoyant (US title: The Evil Mind) is a 1935 British drama film directed by Maurice Elvey and starring Claude Rains, Fay Wray, and Jane Baxter. Based on the novel of the same name by Ernst Lothar, it was made at Islington Studios. The film's sets were designed by the German art director Alfred Junge. Bryan Edgar Wallace contributed to the screenplay.

Plot
Maximus (Claude Rains), "King of the Mind Readers", performs an English music hall mind-reading act with the help of his wife, Rene (Fay Wray), using a secret code. One night, he sees the beautiful Christine Shawn (Jane Baxter) in the audience, and his act becomes reality. He is able to tell what is in a sealed letter without Rene's assistance.

Maximus does not think much of it, until he and Christine meet by chance on a train and he foresees an impending crash. He pulls the emergency cord to stop the train, but nobody believes him. He, his family and Christine disembark, and a few minutes later the train crashes. Christine tells her father, who owns a newspaper. He publishes the story, making Maximus famous.

Maximus realizes that his power only works when Christine is near. As they spend more time together, Christine falls in love with him and Rene becomes jealous. Maximus' mother (Mary Clare) believes that no good can come of this new gift, but Maximus pays little attention, enjoying his well-paid success.

Another of his well-publicized predictions comes true: a 100-to-1 long shot wins The Derby. He chooses to ignore his own prophecy of his mother's death; when it comes true, he is so distraught that he decides to follow her wishes and abandon his ability. He feels compelled to act, however, when he foresees a great mining disaster. He is unable to convince the mining company to evacuate the mine. When the disaster occurs, hundreds are killed and more are missing and presumed dead.

He is publicly accused of causing the accident and is brought to trial. The prosecution claims that Maximus himself caused both tragedies, by delaying the train and by panicking the miners into making a mistake. Maximus predicts in the courtroom that the missing miners will be found alive. When this becomes true, he is released. Maximus decides to give up his gift and he and Rene slip away into obscurity.

Cast 
Claude Rains as Maximus
Fay Wray as Rene
Jane Baxter as Christine Shawn
Mary Clare	as Maximus's mother
Ben Field as Simon
Athole Stewart as Lord Southwood
C. Denier Warren as James J. Bimeter
 Felix Aylmer as Prosecutor  
 Donald Calthrop as Derelict  
 Margaret Davidge as Lodging Housekeeper  
 Carleton Hobbs as Racing Commentator  
 Graham Moffatt as Page Boy  
 Jack Raine as Customs Officer  
 D.J. Williams as Juror

References

Bibliography
 Low, Rachael. Filmmaking in 1930s Britain. George Allen & Unwin, 1985.
 Wood, Linda. British Films, 1927-1939. British Film Institute, 1986.

External links 
 
 
 
 

1935 films
1935 drama films
1930s mystery films
1930s psychological thriller films
British black-and-white films
British drama films
British supernatural films
1930s English-language films
Films directed by Maurice Elvey
Films based on Austrian novels
Films set in England
Films set in London
Gainsborough Pictures films
Islington Studios films
British thriller films
1930s supernatural films
1930s British films